The 1993 Appalachian State Mountaineers football team was an American football team that represented Appalachian State University as a member of the Southern Conference (SoCon) during the 1993 NCAA Division I-AA football season. In their fifth year under head coach Jerry Moore, the Mountaineers compiled an overall record of 4–7 with a conference mark of 4–4.

Schedule

References

Appalachian State
Appalachian State Mountaineers football seasons
Appalachian State Mountaineers football